Philip Malley (born 1 November 1965) is an English former professional footballer who made 99 appearances in the Football League playing as a midfielder for Hartlepool United, Burnley and Stockport County.

References

1965 births
Living people
Footballers from Gateshead
English footballers
Association football midfielders
Sunderland A.F.C. players
Hartlepool United F.C. players
Berwick Rangers F.C. players
Burnley F.C. players
Stockport County F.C. players
Morecambe F.C. players
English Football League players